Goubellat is a town and commune in the Béja Governorate, Tunisia. As of 2014 it had a total population of 15 762.

See also
List of cities in Tunisia

References

Populated places in Tunisia
Communes of Tunisia
Populated places in Béja Governorate
Tunisia geography articles needing translation from French Wikipedia